Nordic Valley (formally titled Wolf Creek Utah Ski Resort) is a small local ski area in Nordic Valley, Utah.  The area was known as Nordic Valley until June 29, 2005, when it was acquired by the nearby Wolf Creek Golf Resort.

The resort is known for its inexpensive tickets and as a good place to take children for their first introduction to skiing or snowboarding.  Wolf Mountain has been described as having "the least expensive skiing and riding in Utah".

The Mountain

Wolf Mountain consists of a large beginner slope on the skiers left and several steeper and longer runs on the skiers right, with a terrain park cutting between the two.  The short double chairlift Wolfdeedo Chair and the newly installed longer Wolf's Lair Triple Chair access the beginner slope and the Wolf's Lair Terrain Park.  Howling Wolf Chair, a longer double chairlift with a midway unloading station, provides the only access to most of the resort's terrain as it runs up the center of the hill; it also accesses the beginner slope and terrain park.  A short surface lift, the Magic Carpet, is also available for beginners.

The creation of the Wolf's Lair Triple Chair expanded the beginner slope several hundred feet up the hill, and allowed the doubling in size of the Wolf's Lair Terrain Park.  The triple chair also allows easier access to the forested area to the north of the terrain park.

The entire mountain is lit for night skiing, and snowmaking covers most runs.  The resort's snowmaking system was revamped in the summer of 2006, one year after its acquisition by Wolf Creek golf resort.  The new system has dramatically improved the reliability of the resort's snow.  Though its low elevation makes for a shorter ski season than most ski areas in Utah, the snowmaking provides a stable base for at least a few months each year.

The Community
Despite the ski resort's name change, many locals continue to refer to the surrounding community as "Nordic Valley."  See Nordic Valley, Utah.

References

External links

 Wolf Mountain's Homepage
 Utah Hiking and Skiing Information

Ski areas and resorts in Utah
Sports venues in Weber County, Utah